The post-reform radiate (the Latin name, like many Roman coins of this time, is unknown), was a Roman coin first issued by Diocletian during his currency reforms. The radiate looked very similar to the antoninianus (pre-reform radiate), with a radiate crown, similar to the one worn by the Roman deity, Sol Invictus. It is different from the Antoninianus because of the absence of the "XXI" that existed on pre-reform radiates, a symbol believed to have indicated a consistence of 20 parts bronze to 1 part silver. The post-reform radiate had little or no silver content. 
The weight can vary between 2.23 and 3.44 grams.

There also exists radiates of Maximian, Constantius I, and Galerius, Diocletian's co-rulers, in the same style.

See also
Edict on Maximum Prices

References

Bibliography
Radiate on Forumancientcoins Accessed on 13 September 2006
Doug smith information on denomination Accessed on 13 September 2006

290s establishments in the Roman Empire
Coins of ancient Rome
Diocletian
Sol Invictus